Windmills is the debut solo album by country rock musician Rick Roberts. The album was recorded a year after his stint as lead singer of The Flying Burrito Brothers, and two years before co-founding the band Firefall.

Roberts was joined on the record by Burrito Brothers bandmate Chris Hillman, as well as three of the Eagles: Don Henley, Bernie Leadon (formerly of the Burrito Brothers), and Randy Meisner. Other guest musicians include David Crosby, Jackson Browne, Al Perkins, Dallas Taylor, Marc Benno and Byron Berline. The standout tracks are "Sail Away", "In My Own Small Way", and "Jenny's Blues", and all of the songs were written by Roberts, except Harlan Howard's "Pick Me Up on Your Way Down".

Track listing
"Deliver Me"  (Roberts) - 4:51
"Davy McVie"  (Roberts) - 3:45
"In My Own Small Way"  (Roberts) - 2:57
"Sail Away"  (Roberts) - 7:17
"Two Lovely Women"  (Roberts) - 4:39
"In a Dream"  (Roberts) - 4:12
"Drunk and Dirty"  (Roberts) - 3:42
"Pick Me Up on Your Way Down"  (Harlan Howard) - 2:53
"Jenny's Blues"  (Roberts) - 3:46

Personnel
Rick Roberts - guitar, lead vocals, choir
Bernie Leadon - banjo, guitar, harmony vocals, choir
Don Henley - drums, harmony vocals, choir
Al Perkins - steel guitar, guitar
Chris Hillman - bass
Randy Meisner - bass, choir
Byron Berline - fiddle
Dallas Taylor - drums
Joe Lala - percussion
David Crosby - harmony vocals
Jackson Browne - harmony vocals
Mother Hen - piano, harmony vocals
Mike Utley - organ
Marc Benno - guitar
Leland Sklar - bass

Production
Producer: David Anderle
Recording Engineer: Richard Moore/Kent Nebergall
Art Direction: unknown
Photography: unknown
Liner Notes: unknown

References

Rick Roberts (musician) albums
1972 debut albums
A&M Records albums